The International Conference on Computer Vision (ICCV) is a research conference sponsored by the Institute of Electrical and Electronics Engineers (IEEE) held every other year. It is considered to be one of the top conferences in computer vision, alongside CVPR and ECCV,
and it is held on years in which ECCV is not.

The conference is usually spread over four to five days. Typically, experts in the focus areas give tutorial talks on the first day, then the technical sessions (and poster sessions in parallel) follow. Recent conferences have also had an increasing number of focused workshops and a commercial exhibition.

Awards

Azriel Rosenfeld Lifetime Achievement Award
The Azriel Rosenfeld Award, or Azriel Rosenfeld Lifetime Achievement Award, recognizes researchers who have made significant contributions to the field of computer vision over their careers. It is named in memory of computer scientist and mathematician Azriel Rosenfeld. The following people have received this award:

Helmholtz Prize
The ICCV Helmholtz Prize, known as the Test of Time Award before 2013, is awarded every other year at the ICCV, recognizing ICCV papers from ten or more years earlier that had a significant impact on computer vision research. Winners are selected by the IEEE Computer Society's Technical Committee on Pattern Analysis and Machine Intelligence. The award is named after the 19th century physician and physicist Hermann von Helmholtz, and the ICCV's award is not related to the various Helmholtz Prizes in physics, or the Hermann von Helmholtz Prize in neuroscience.

Marr Prize

The ICCV best-paper award is the Marr Prize, named after British neuroscientist David Marr.

Mark Everingham Prize
The Mark Everingham Prize is an award given yearly by the Technical Committee on Pattern Analysis and Machine Intelligence of the IEEE Computer Society at the IEEE International Conference on Computer Vision or the European Conference on Computer Vision to commemorate the late Mark Everingham, "one of the rising stars of computer vision", and to encourage others to follow in his footsteps by acting to further progress in the computer vision community as a whole. The prize is given to a researcher, or a team of researchers, who have made a selfless contribution of significant benefit to other members of the computer vision community. The Mark Everingham Prize for Rigorous Evaluation was an award given in 2012 at the British Machine Vision Conference.

PAMI Distinguished Researcher Award
The PAMI Distinguished Researcher Award (until 2013 called Significant Researcher Award) is awarded to candidates whose research projects have significantly contributed to the progress of computer vision. Awards are made based on major research contributions, as well as the role of those contributions in influencing and inspiring other research. Candidates are nominated by the community. The following people have received this award:

Conference List 

The conference is usually held in the spring in various international locations.

See also
 Computer Vision and Pattern Recognition
 European Conference on Computer Vision

References

IEEE conferences
Signal processing conferences
Computer science conferences
Computer vision research infrastructure